George Alois Gerberman (March 8, 1942 – January 7, 2022) was an American professional baseball player. He was the starting pitcher on September 23 against the first-year New York Mets at the Polo Grounds and allowed only one earned run over 5⅓ innings, but did not gain a decision in an eventual 2–1 Chicago defeat.

Gerberman had been drafted by the Cubs out of the Brave organization after his debut season in professional baseball. After posting a 13–5 record with 13 complete games with the Class B Wenatchee Chiefs in 1962, he was recalled by Chicago when the rosters expanded in September. In Gerberman's lone Major League appearance, he gave up only three hits, but allowed five bases on balls and one home run, to the Mets' Frank Thomas. The long ball — only the second hit of the game for the Mets — tied the game at one in the sixth inning. Gerberman got the next hitter, Ed Kranepool, on a ground ball, but he then surrendered a single to Sammy Drake and was relieved by Freddie Burdette thereafter.

Gerberman recorded one strikeout (of Jim Hickman) in his only MLB appearance.

References

External links
Career record and playing statistics from Baseball Reference

1942 births
2022 deaths
Amarillo Gold Sox players
Amarillo Sonics players
Baseball players from Texas
Chicago Cubs players
Dallas–Fort Worth Spurs players
Fort Worth Cats players
Major League Baseball pitchers
People from El Campo, Texas
Wellsville Braves players
Wenatchee Chiefs players